Heidegger Studies is an annual peer-reviewed academic journal covering the thought of Martin Heidegger published by Duncker & Humblot. It was established in 1985 and publishes contributions in English, German, and French. The editors-in-chief are Parvis Emad, Friedrich-Wilhelm von Herrmann, Pascal David, Paola-Ludovika Coriando, and Ingeborg Schüßler. All issues are available online from the Philosophy Documentation Center.

See also 
 List of philosophy journals

External links 
 

Annual journals
Multilingual journals
Publications established in 1985
Continental philosophy
Works about Martin Heidegger
Heidegger, Martin
Philosophy Documentation Center academic journals